Henning Holst (25 October 1891 – 20 March 1975) was a Danish field hockey player who competed in the 1920 Summer Olympics, in the 1928 Summer Olympics, and in the 1936 Summer Olympics. He was born in Copenhagen and died in Helleruplund, Gentofte.

In 1920 he was a member of the Danish field hockey team, which won the silver medal. Eight years later he also participated with the Danish team in the 1928 Olympic tournament. He played all four matches as halfback and scored three goals. His last Olympic appearance was in 1936 when he was eliminated with the Danish team in the first round of the Olympic tournament. He played both matches.

References

External links
 

1891 births
1975 deaths
Danish male field hockey players
Olympic field hockey players of Denmark
Field hockey players at the 1920 Summer Olympics
Field hockey players at the 1928 Summer Olympics
Field hockey players at the 1936 Summer Olympics
Olympic silver medalists for Denmark
Olympic medalists in field hockey
Medalists at the 1920 Summer Olympics
Sportspeople from Copenhagen